Tatjana Živanović (born 6 August 1990 in Kraljevo, SFR Yugoslavia) is a Serbian women's basketball player.

Personal life
In September 2017, she got engaged to her boyfriend at training of Kraljevo.

References

External links
 Profile at eurobasket.com
 Profile at alfa-globe.com

1990 births
Living people
Sportspeople from Kraljevo
Serbian women's basketball players
Power forwards (basketball)
Centers (basketball)
ŽKK Voždovac players
ŽKK Šumadija Kragujevac players
Mediterranean Games silver medalists for Serbia
Competitors at the 2009 Mediterranean Games
Serbian expatriate basketball people in Cyprus
Serbian expatriate basketball people in Spain
Mediterranean Games medalists in basketball